Abraham Salm (26 March 1857, Amsterdam - 13 June 1915, Amsterdam), was a Dutch architect.

Biography

He was born in Amsterdam as the son of the architect , whom he assisted. Together they visited the Exposition Universelle (1878) in Paris, and afterwards in 1880 he returned to Amsterdam where he became his father's partner. From 1898 to 1912 he was founding chairman of the Amsterdam architectural society Maatschappij tot Bevordering der Bouwkunst.

References

Netherlands Architecture Institute: Abraham Salm (GBzn.)

External links

1857 births
1915 deaths
Architects from Amsterdam
19th-century Dutch architects
20th-century Dutch architects